Priscila Chinchilla (born 11 July 2001) is a Costa Rican international footballer who plays as a midfielder for Glasgow City and the Costa Rica women's national football team. She appeared in three matches for Costa Rica and scored two goals at the 2018 CONCACAF Women's U-17 Championship.

Career
Chinchilla began her career with Liga Deportiva Alajuelense, scoring 86 league goals.

On 21 December 2020, Chinchilla joined Scottish Women's Premier League champions Glasgow City on a two year deal. She was named as the PFA Scotland Women's Player of the Year for the 2021–22 season (the inaugural year of the award).

International goals

References

2001 births
Living people
Women's association football midfielders
Costa Rican women's footballers
Costa Rica women's international footballers
Pan American Games bronze medalists for Costa Rica
Pan American Games medalists in football
Footballers at the 2019 Pan American Games
Medalists at the 2019 Pan American Games
Glasgow City F.C. players
Costa Rican expatriate footballers
Expatriate women's footballers in Scotland
Costa Rican expatriate sportspeople in the United Kingdom
Scottish Women's Premier League players